Bernardo Canaccio (1297 in Bologna – sometime after 1357) was an Italian poet.

Life
He was the son of Arpinello, known as Canaccio, who belonged to the Ghibelline Scannabecchi family. Aged two, his family was exiled and moved to Verona, where Bernardo and his brother Guglielmo met Scaligeri and probably Dante - the latter was in Verona from 1313 to 1319. From 1319 to 1320 Bernardo studied under Dante, who was then a guest of the Polenta family in Ravenna. On 26 August 1356 he was in Ravenna assisting in the writing of the will of his wife Sara da Camposampiero. An anonymous sonnet attributes the poem on Dante's sarcophagus to Canaccio – it is also mentioned in Boccaccio's Life of Dante.

References 

1297 births
14th-century Italian poets
Dante Alighieri
Writers from Verona